Symphyotrichum turneri (formerly Aster moranensis var. turneri) is a species of flowering plant in the family Asteraceae native to Durango, Mexico.

Description
Its blue to purple ray florets open October–March.

Taxonomy
The basionym of Symphyotrichum turneri is Aster moranensis var. turneri, first described by American botanists Scott D. Sundberg and Almut Gitter Jones in 1986.

The specific epithet "turneri" is the  Latinisation of surname "Turner" for the late Billie Lee Turner, American botanist and professor of botany at the University of Texas at Austin.

Distribution and habitat

Citations

References

turneri
Flora of Mexico
Plants described in 1986
Taxa named by Scott D. Sundberg
Taxa named by Almut Gitter Jones